The British Society for Immunology, or BSI, is a UK-based organisation of British immunologists but accepts members from all countries. It was founded in November 1956 by John H. Humphrey, Robin Coombs, Bob White, and Avrion Mitchison and is one of the oldest and largest Immunology societies in the world and the largest in Europe. It publishes two scientific journals: Immunology and Clinical and Experimental Immunology.

BSI members work throughout the entire Immunology chain, stretching from the laboratory bench right through to the clinics and hospitals in which patients are treated - from discovery to delivery. The fields in which they work are wide and extensive, from HIV/AIDS to allergy, diabetes, malaria, tuberculosis, animal health, arthritis, transplantation, vaccination and infectious disease.

The BSI’s main objective is to promote and support excellence in research, scholarship and clinical practice in immunology for the benefit of human and animal health and welfare. The BSI seeks to help British Immunology accomplish the highest possible goals.

To meet this objective, the BSI undertakes the following:
 Running innovative events in research, public engagement and education
 Promoting and disseminating research and good practice in Immunology, translational medicine and vaccination
 Working with its members to develop the benefits of membership and the relevance of the Society
 Providing bursaries and grants
 Enhancing public awareness of immunology
 Influencing policy and decision makers
 Working with other societies

The incumbent President of the Board of Trustees is Professor Peter Openshaw (Imperial College London)

The Board of Trustees is composed of: Dr Lindsay Nicholson (University of Bristol), Professor Anne Cooke (University of Cambridge), Professor Robert Barker (University of Aberdeen), Dr Leonie Taams (King's College London), Dr Diane Williamson (DSTL), Dr Bill Egner (Sheffield Teaching Hospitals NHS Foundation Trust), Dr Sheena Cruickshank (University of Manchester)

Affiliated Societies
The BSI is a member society of the following organisations:
 Federation of Clinical Immunology Societies
 International Union of Immunological Societies
 European Federation of Immunological Studies
 World Allergy Organization
 Society of Biology

See also
 Spanish Society for Immunology
 International Union of Immunological Societies

References

Health in the London Borough of Camden
Medical associations based in the United Kingdom
Immunology professional associations
1956 establishments in the United Kingdom
Organisations based in the London Borough of Camden
Scientific organizations established in 1956